NolaPro is a cloud/web-based ERP application running under a proprietary commercial license.  It was first released in 2003 as a freeware accounting  alternative to SAP ERP and QuickBooks because of its ability to scale in these markets.

Functionality 
NolaPro allows custom functionality changes upon request. It permits unrestricted integration with 3rd party applications and offers source code procurement for companies to develop their own ERP systems.

This application can be cloud-hosted by the author or installed locally on Microsoft Windows or Linux, accessed via common web browsers, and utilizes MySQL and PHP.

The software includes the following modules:

 Accounts Payable
 Accounts Receivable
 Administrative Tools
 Business-to-Business (B2B) Web Portal
 Customer Database
 General Ledger
 Inventory Management
 Order Tracking (Fulfillment & Service)
 Payroll & Employee Timeclock
 Point-of-Sale (PoS)
 Shopping Cart (modified OSCommerce) for e-commerce transactions.
 Vendor Database

Multi-currency is available for NolaPro, making it one of the few small applications which supports monetary exchange rates.  It has been translated into 30+ languages via contributions from the NolaPro community.  An API is also available for developers who wish to integrate NolaPro with their in-house or 3rd party applications.  From 2013-16, NolaPro was featured on all Lenovo devices under the Windows 8 store platform.

Reviews
CNet editors awarded NolaPro 4.5 out of 5 stars.

In May 2005, NolaPro was recognized by Entrepreneur Magazine by its inclusion in Entrepreneur's 2005 Complete Guide to Software.

TechRepublic blog writer Jack Wallen positively reviewed NolaPro 4 in January 2008 providing a comprehensive user-walkthrough and installation overview.

NolaPro was featured on the cover of the Linux Journal in November 2008.

CBS News Moneywatch featured NolaPro in January 2009.

NolaPro was reviewed by Personal Financial Advices in June 2019, providing an accurate overview of the software's functionality and services.

In November 2019, The Balance (formerly About.com) ranked NolaPro as the #1 option for Small Business Accounting software.

See also
 Accounting software
 Comparison of accounting software

References

External links
 NolaPro homepage

ASP Accounting Systems
Business software companies
Software companies of the United States
ERP software
ERP software companies
Accounting software for Linux
PHP software
Web applications